A Short History of Decay is a 2013 American comedy-drama film written and directed by Michael Maren. It stars Bryan Greenberg, Linda Lavin, Harris Yulin, Emmanuelle Chriqui, Benjamin King and Kathleen Rose Perkins. Though its title is taken from the work of philosophy by Emil Cioran, it is not an adaptation of the book.

The film was shot in October and November 2012 in Wilmington, North Carolina, Wrightsville Beach, North Carolina, and New York City. It premiered at the Hamptons International Film Festival on October 12, 2013 and it opened theatrically at the Village East Cinema on May 16, 2014.

Plot
The film is a comedy about a failed Brooklyn writer, Nathan Fisher, who visits his ailing parents in Florida. His mother has Alzheimer's, his father has recently had a stroke, and his girlfriend has recently broken up with him.

Cast
 Bryan Greenberg as Nathan Fisher
 Linda Lavin as Sandy Fisher
 Harris Yulin as Bob Fisher
 Emmanuelle Chriqui as Erika Bryce
 Kathleen Rose Perkins as Shelly
 Benjamin King as Jack Fisher
 Rebecca Dayan as Alex
 Joanna Manning as Molly

Coffeehouse scene

On November 19, 2012, Maren, with cinematographer Nancy Schreiber, shot the final scenes of the film at Kos Koffe, a coffee shop in Park Slope, Brooklyn. In the scene, Greenberg's Nathan Fisher walks into the shop intending to work on his writing to win his girlfriend back. In an elaborate sight gag, Maren brought 43 New York Area writers to fill every seat in the coffee shop. Nathan Fisher looks at them with the feeling that he doesn't belong in their company. The writers included Jennifer Egan, Michael Cunningham, Philip Gourevich, Kurt Andersen, Gary Shteyngart, Darin Strauss, Jane Green, Jean Hanff Korelitz and Nick Flynn.

References

External links
 
 https://www.rottentomatoes.com/m/a_short_history_of_decay
 Paladin Picks up ‘A Short History of Decay’ for Theatrical Release
 Movie review. Edelstein on A Short History of Decay: The Little That Happens Is More Than Enough in This Beautiful Tale : New York Magazine

2013 films
2013 black comedy films
2013 comedy-drama films
American black comedy films
American comedy-drama films
American films about Alzheimer's disease
Films about writers
Films set in Florida
Films set in New York City
Films shot in New York (state)
Films shot in New York City
Films shot in North Carolina
2010s English-language films
2010s American films